Akron Children's Hospital (ACH) is a pediatric acute care hospital in Northeast Ohio that provides care to infants, children, adolescents, young adults, aged 0–21 and even some older adults.

History
Akron Children's Hospital  began as a day nursery in 1890. In 2010, it was the largest pediatric health care provider in northeast Ohio. Akron Children's Hospital has 78 locations throughout the region, including a 289-bed campus in downtown Akron and a 32-bed campus in Boardman, Ohio, Akron Children's Hospital has approximately 4,600 employees and cares for more than half a million children and adults each year.

In 2014 Cleveland Clinic Children's Hospital entered into a collaboration with Akron Children's Hospital to open up a pediatric and adult congenital heart program.

In 2019 it was announced that Akron Children’s Hospital and the Cleveland Clinic would be expanding the pediatric and adult congenital heart program that was started 2014. The expansion consisted of two new centers, located at Akron Children’s and Cleveland Clinic Children’s Hospital. In addition, five-more-years was added to the agreement.

Akron Children's offers a full range of services to its 25-county region, including well visits and trauma and intensive care to treatment of rare and serious childhood disorders.  Children's main campus in downtown Akron houses regional centers for genetics, fetal treatment, cancer and blood disorders, heart, palliative care, orthopedics, pediatric trauma, pediatric intensive care, and level III neonatal intensive care, among others. Children's is one of two pediatric hospitals in the country that operates a burn center for both adults and children. Akron Children's Paul and Carol David Foundation Burn Institute is among a few burn centers verified by both the American Burn Association and The Committee on Trauma of The American College of Surgeons.

Akron Children's Beeghly Campus in Boardman includes a 32-bed pediatric inpatient unit; a Level II pediatric trauma center; a center for childhood cancer and blood disorders; an infusion center, as well as EEG/ECHO/EKG, radiology, laboratory and rehabilitation services. Services based in the Mahoning Valley include a 33-bed neonatal special care nursery; child advocacy, community outreach and education center; and subspecialty practices for cardiology, orthopedics, nephrology, neurology, rheumatology, pulmonology and genetics. Children's provides additional pediatric services at Summa Akron City Hospital, Cleveland Clinic Akron General, MedCentral Health System in Mansfield, Aultman Hospital in Canton, Fisher-Titus Medical Center in Norwalk and University Hospitals Portage Medical Center in Ravenna, as well as offices in Beachwood and Hudson.

Akron Children's Hospital has earned the Gold Seal of Approval from the Joint Commission and Magnet Recognition Status from the American Nurses Credentialing Center.

Controversy
In November 2013, the hospital went to court to prevent an 11-year-old Amish leukemia patient and her parents from making treatment decisions, when the patient chose to discontinue a second round of chemotherapy after it made her "extremely ill." An appeals court ruled that the state's duty to protect the child's well-being outweighed the parents' beliefs and convictions, and an attorney who was also a nurse, was given limited guardianship of the child. As a result of the hospital's actions, the patient's family went into hiding to avoid having their daughter "kidnapped." The girl's father told the Associated Press that the family does not oppose modern medicine nor did they make their decision based on religious beliefs. In 2014, the court-appointed guardian was allowed to stop her efforts to force the family to resume chemotherapy; the guardian stated that she didn't have access to the child, making it impossible for her to make medical decisions. In October 2015, the court formally ended the guardianship.

Affiliations and programs
The hospital is a clinical training site for undergraduate and graduate registered nurse (RN) students and licensed practical nurse (LPN) students from 35 affiliated nursing schools across Ohio and additional schools in West Virginia, Missouri, Illinois, and Colorado, and is also a clinical training site for the Radiologic Technology (RT) program from The University of Akron. Children's is affiliated with Northeast Ohio Medical University (NEOMED) in Rootstown as one of the school's nine major hospital associations.

Akron Children's Hospital offers several pediatric sub-specialty fellowship programs.
Pediatric Emergency Medicine
Pediatric Radiology
Pediatric Sports Medicine
Pediatric Pathology
Pediatric Psychiatry
Pediatric Palliative Care
Developmental Pediatrics
Pediatric Hematology/Oncology

The Cooperative Medical Technology Program of Akron is a joint educational effort with Akron General Medical Center and Summa Health Systems that offers training in medical technology.

The American Heart Association (AHA) Community Training Center at Children's is one of the largest in Ohio. It offers advanced cardiac life support, pediatric advanced life support, CPR, AED and first aid courses.

The Showers Family Center for Childhood Cancer and Blood Disorders is recognized as a "Pediatric Teaching Cancer Program" by the American College of Surgeons Commission on Cancer.

In 2020, U.S. News & World Report ranked Children's in the top 50 children's hospitals in six pediatric specialties: urology, pulmonology, neonatology, gastroenterology, orthopedics, neurology, neurosurgery.

References

25. Akron Children's Hospital Trauma Center receives level 1 verification from the American College of Surgeons. Akron Children's Hospital. (n.d.). Retrieved February 17, 2023, from https://www.akronchildrens.org/news/Akron-Children-s-Hospital-Trauma-Center-receives-Level-1-verification-from-the-American-College-of-Surgeons.html

External links
 

Children's hospitals in the United States
Hospitals in Ohio
Buildings and structures in Summit County, Ohio
Pediatric trauma centers